Anse Royale is an administrative district of Seychelles located on the island of Mahé. The Seychelles Polytechnic School of the Humanities is located in this district.

Gallery

Notable people
 Naadir Hassan, Foreign minister.

References

Districts of Seychelles
Mahé, Seychelles